WUDL-LD, virtual channel 19 (UHF digital channel 35), is a low-powered television station licensed to Detroit, Michigan, United States. The station is owned by the DTV America subsidiary of HC2 Holdings. The station's transmitter is located in Oak Park, Michigan at a power of 10 kilowatts. It formerly broadcast on UHF 47 at 2.7 kW with a northerly-aimed directional antenna to protect adjacent-channel WMNT-CD (channel 48) in Toledo, Ohio, from a tower located at the Renaissance Center in downtown Detroit.

History
The station opened in the on August 24, 1983 as a SIN affiliate owned by Washington, D.C.-based Los Cerezos Television, first with the callsign K66BV and later W66BV. The station folded in the early-1990s. Shortly after its shutdown, the transmitter and license were sold to TBN, and returned to the air as a full-time repeater of Trinity Broadcasting Network's (TDN) national feed.

In February 2006, the station was granted a construction permit to begin converting operations to digital television. Upon completion, the station became a digital repeater of TBN, broadcasting all five TBN services at 19.7 kW (although later signed-on at 2.7 kW). Due to the phase-out of channels 52 to 69, the station was approved for relocation to Channel 47.

On the evening of November 9, 2009, the analog signal of W66BV went dark. Since then, the station's analog feed has broadcast intermittently. TBN notified the Federal Communications Commission that W66BV had ceased operations March 25, 2010 due to declining support, which was attributed to the digital television transition.  However, on May 12, 2010, the repeater resumed broadcasting for about a month, before again going dark. During the analog era, the station had broadcast on UHF 66 with an effective radiated power of 19.7 kW. It broadcasts digitally on UHF 47 with an effective radiated power of just 2.7 kW that can increase to 10 kW.

W66BV converted its signal to digital on channel 47 and was broadcasting all five of TBN's subchannel networks on its signal which was delivered directly from TBN's national satellite feed. On January 7, 2011, it changed its call sign to W47DL-D. The TBN Enlace USA service on subchannel 47.5 became the only aerial non-English channel in the Detroit/Windsor area, following WUDT-LD's switch from Univision to Daystar Television Network in 2009, and the closedown of Windsor's Radio-Canada outlet CBEFT in 2012. Although it carried all five TBN networks, they were arranged in a different order than most TBN affiliates. When W47DL converted to digital, the PSIP didn't show as the former physical channel 66, but as the new physical channel 47.

Neither Comcast Detroit, Bright House Livonia nor Cogeco Windsor had W47DL-D in their line-ups, though both systems offered the national TBN feed, seen part-time on Comcast channel 70 from 2 pm to 2 am, and shared with The Inspiration Network and full-time on digital channel 290, as well as on Bright House digital channel 116.

Some TBN repeaters, including W47DL-D, use Dish Network equipment to pick up the signal off of Dish Network's satellites, instead of a free-to-air source. This occasionally led to technical problems: for about 10 days following June 12, 2009, W66BV broadcast an error screen informing viewers that a new smart card was needed to view the station, and to contact Dish Network.  On Monday, June 22, the problem was resolved and the TBN feed returned to W66BV.

In 2010, following financial problems that led to the closedown and sale of many of its repeaters to other parties, W47DL-D was one of the few TBN translators that remained in service under TBN ownership.

On April 13, 2012, TBN sold 36 of its translators, including W47DL-D, to Regal Media (a broadcasting group headed by George Cooney, the CEO of the EUE/Screen Gems Studios). The sale was approved by the FCC, and under Regal, the station continued to air TBN.

On July 23, 2012, W47DL-D applied to move to UHF 19 and increase power from 2.7 kW to 15 kW.

On February 10, 2015, Regal Media sold W47DL-D to King Forward, Inc., with management/operation of the station listed as Bella Spectra Corporation. They then re-listed the station as a direct repeater of KTBN-TV (rather than as a satellite-fed translator).  As part of the sale, King Forward applied for a silent Special Temporary Authority replacing programming on all five subchannels with a transitioning slide announcing that the channel was available for rent.  Channel 47.2 was later re-allocated as an audio-less test broadcast of the Ethiopian television network ESAT.

On May 4, 2015, the station changed its call-sign to WUDL-LD. Broadcasts on the new UHF 19 frequency began around February 27, 2016, and expanded the coverage area into parts of nearby inner-city suburbs such as Wyandotte and Melvindale.

Digital television

None of WUDL's subchannels transmit electronic program guide (EPG) information. However, closed captioning is transmitted on all subchannels except for 19.1 and 19.4.

See also
Media in Detroit

References

External links

UDL-LD
Low-power television stations in the United States
Television channels and stations established in 1980
1980 establishments in Michigan
Quest (American TV network) affiliates
Innovate Corp.